The 7th Asia Pacific Screen Awards were held in Brisbane, Australia on 15 December 2013.

Awards

Films and countries with multiple nominations

References

Asia Pacific Screen Awards
Asia Pacific Screen Awards
Asia Pacific Screen Awards
Asia Pacific Screen Awards